Mauzy is an unincorporated community located in Rockingham County, in the U.S. state of Virginia. It is located south of Timberville, just north of Lacey Spring along Route 259, just off Interstate 81.

References

Unincorporated communities in Rockingham County, Virginia
Unincorporated communities in Virginia